Free is the second solo album by Canadian singer Lisa Shaw, released in 2009.

Track listing
"Better Days" – 3:49
"Honey" – 4:52
"Find the Way" – 5:34
"Like I Want To" – 5:23
"Free" – 5:25
"Music in You" – 4:43
"All Night High" – 5:58
"Feel" – 4:25
"Can You See Him" – 5:10
"I'm Okay" – 4:58
"Tomorrow" – 4:46
"Inside My Love" – 3:34
"Sky High" – 3:49

Personnel
 Tony Espinoza – mastering, mixing
 Matthias Heilbronn – engineer
 Tim Kvasnosky – composer, producer
 Miguel Migs – composer, mixing, producer
 Lisa Shaw – vocals, composer
 Dave Warrin – composer, keyboards, producer
 Ethan White – composer, producer

References

External links 
 http://www.allmusic.com/album/free-mw0000814108
 http://www.allmusic.com/album/free-mw0000814108/credits

2009 albums
Deep house albums
Lisa Shaw albums